The Scottish Football League XI was a representative side of the Scottish Football League (SFL). Soon after the creation of the SFL in 1890, there was a desire on the part of its officials to test its strength against its older counterpart (English) Football League. A match between the Scottish League and The Football League XI was first played in April 1892 at Pike's Lane, Bolton and ended in a 2–2 draw. The Scottish League also played representative matches against the Irish League XI, League of Ireland XI, a Welsh League XI, a Danish Combination and the Italian league. They had also played four fundraising matches during World War I and six unofficial trial matches against Scotland between 1958 and 1964 - players involved in those matches are recorded separately.

A Scottish League team last played in 1990, to mark the league's centenary, in a match against the Scotland national team. The Scottish Football League ceased to exist in 2013, when it merged with the Scottish Premier League to form the Scottish Professional Football League.

Bobby Evans holds the record for Scottish League XI appearances, having played 25 times between 1948 and 1960. George Young attained 22 caps, and is the only other player to have won at least 20. Seventeen other players achieved at least 10 caps. Willie Bauld scored the most goals for the Scottish League XI, with his 15 goals coming in 13 appearances between 1949 and 1958. Lawrie Reilly scored 14 goals in as many games. As well as being the third highest scorer, Barney Battles, Jr. is also the most prolific, with his 13 goals coming from only five games (averaging 2.6 goals per game). Bobby Collins (12) and William Reid (10) also scored at least 10 goals for the team.

List of players

Inter-league matches
Of the 155 players who made at least four appearances for the Scottish League team, only eight never played for the full Scotland team, including John Stewart Wright whose career coincided with World War I and played in unofficial internationals, Bob Ferrier who was ineligible during his era due to being born in Sheffield, South African Johnny Hubbard, and goalkeepers Willie White and George Niven, the latter of whom is the Rangers player with most appearances for the club without a full cap, having missed out through injury on several occasions. The other players in that group are John McFarlane, Chic Geatons and Willie Rankin.

Barney Battles Jr. was capped for both Scotland and the United States, Joe Kennaway played for Scotland and Canada, and Patsy Gallacher featured for both Ireland teams.

Notes

Scotland trial matches / SFL Centenary players

During World War I, no inter-league matches were played after the English and Irish leagues were suspended in 1915. The Scottish League continued to operate, and three post-season challenge matches were arranged in 1915, 1916 and 1917, with the proceeds going to charities and war fundraising; the SFL XI (including some players who were contracted to English clubs but had returned to play in Scotland temporarily as the league continued, while the English Football League was suspended) played against the title-winning club, which was Celtic on all three occasions. An additional match against a Military XI was also played in 1917 (again no Celtic players were selected as they played the Glasgow Merchants Charity Cup final on the same day). In 1918, the Navy and Army War Fund Shield was played between clubs instead.
Between 1958 and 1964, except in 1963, the Scottish League XI played an annual mid-season trial match against the Scotland (SFA) team (or an approximation thereof) in an attempt to judge the ability of players in both sides for possible selection for the national squad. A previous similar match took place in 1955 between Scotland and Scotland B. Due to the matches' potential importance for some of the players' careers, they were taken fairly seriously and were well attended, although some call-offs through injury and clashes with important club fixtures led to weaker teams taking the field than the original squads in some cases. As they were not inter-league fixtures, these six matches are counted separately from other SFL XI totals, likewise the Scotland appearances and goals are not official - some of the players selected never received a full cap. A few players featured for both sides, particularly when they had played for an SFL club but then moved to England so were no longer eligible. The trials did serve as a stepping stone to the Scotland team for some players on both the SFA and SFL teams, although in terms of improving the standard of international players, the experimental series could be judged not to have been particularly successful as Scotland made little impact on the first relevant tournament after the initial trial match (the 1958 FIFA World Cup) and failed to qualify for the next seven major competitions, their next being the 1974 FIFA World Cup. They did manage to win three editions of the British Home Championship outright in the 1960s.
The 16-man SFL centenary match squad which faced Scotland's 1990 FIFA World Cup squad in August 1990 contained 10 players who were already full internationals. Boyd, Lambert, Robertson, Wright and McKinlay were later capped by Scotland (Boyd within weeks); only Dutchman van der Hoorn was never selected for his country.
Flag icon in FIFA field shows the player gained a full FIFA-recognised cap for that nation.

Players for Scotland XI against SFL XI
§ = Player was never capped at full international level.

References

Sources
 
A Record of pre-war Scottish League Players, John Litster, Scottish Football Historian magazine, October 2012 (all players involved denoted in statistical list)

 
Association football player non-biographical articles
Association football league representative team players
Association football in Scotland lists